Pernilla Sofie Nordlund (born 10 October 1990) is a Finnish former football midfielder, who last played for Umeå IK in the Swedish Damallsvenskan.

She was a member of the Finnish national team since 2011, winning 22 caps.

Nordlund quit football for health reasons in April 2013, aged 22. It was just three months before UEFA Women's Euro 2013.

References

1990 births
Living people
Finnish women's footballers
Finland women's international footballers
Expatriate women's footballers in Sweden
Damallsvenskan players
Swedish-speaking Finns
Umeå IK players
Kansallinen Liiga players
Finnish expatriate footballers
Women's association football midfielders